Edwige, also known as Edwige Belmore (September 1957 - September 22, 2015) was a French model, singer and actor. She was considered an icon of 1980s France, and was called the "Queen of the punks". She founded and sang with the group Mathématiques modernes, as well as being the public face of the club Le Palace.

Biography
Edwige Bessuand was born in September 1957 in Paris, and was taken into state care after being abandoned. As a teenager, she lived in the Kremlin-Bicêtre. Her adoptive parents separated and kicked her out of the house when she was 17. 

Edwige went to live with Maud Molyneux and Paquita Paquin, on the rue Vavin, where she gradually turned into punk, shaving her hair and dyeing it platinum when it grew back. She spent her nights at Le Sept with Molyneux and Paquin, at Le Bains Douches where she sometimes performed on stage or at La Main Bleue with her friends Paquita and Eva Ionesco. 

She becomes "the figurehead" of Le Palace as its bouncer. Her meeting with Paloma Picasso introduced her to the world of the jet-set. She became friends with Yves Saint Laurent and Loulou de la Falaise. She went to New York for the first time at the end of 1977 and attended Studio 54. She returned regularly to the city over the following years. 

In 1977, after a photoshoot by Pierre Commoy, Edwige was featured on the cover of Façade magazine issue 4 kissing Andy Warhol on the cheek. The title on the cover read "The queen of punk and the pope of pop" 

In 1979, Edwige founded the music group Mathématiques modernes with Claude Arto. She was the singer. She was then supported by Philippe Guibourgé who gave her clothes from Chanel.

Edwige modeled for Jean-Paul Gaultier and Thierry Mugler. She was photographed in 1990 by Pierre and Gilles for a work entitled Sainte Gertrude la Grande. "The strong temperament of our model and her boyish appearance went well with the reputation for rigor and austerity of this intellectual and mystical figure that was Gertrude the Great" explains the photographers. During her career, she was photographed several times by Pierre and Gilles, both for the press and for advertising. Long before, she was also the subject of photographs by Helmut Newton for a rarely published photo, Maripol a few years later, and Jean-Baptiste Mondino. 

Edwige married Jean-Louis Jorge, fifteen years her senior.

In 2012, Edwige appeared in a documentary by Jérôme de Missolz, Des jeunes gens mödernes. In the film, a group of young artists, fascinated by the punk movement, meet a music critic from the period. 

She lived in India, then went to live in New York, and finally in Miami, where she lived at the Vagabond Hotel.

Edwige Belmore died in Florida on September 22, 2015 in a local hospital, at the estimated age of 58. She died of liver failure due to untreated hepatitis.

Films
Actress

2016 The Incomparable Rose Hartman (Documentary) 
2014 The Starck Club (Documentary) Self
2011 Kids of Töday Self (as Edwige Belmore)
2004 Rose Palace (Documentary)

References

Source

See also 
 Gazolines
 David Rochline
 Philippe Krootchey
 Vincent Darré
 Yves Adrien
 Farida Khelfa

External links
Edwige
https://www.interviewmagazine.com/culture/edwige-of-le-palace

2015 deaths